The 2007 Princeton Tigers football team was an American football team that represented Princeton University during the 2007 NCAA Division I FCS football season. Princeton tied for fourth in the Ivy League. Princeton averaged 10,215 fans per game.

In their eighth year under head coach Roger Hughes, the Tigers compiled a 4–6 record, though they were outscored 264 to 201. Brendan Circle and Jon Stern were the team captains.

Princeton's 3–4 conference record tied with Dartmouth and Penn for fourth in the Ivy League standings. The Tigers were outscored 171 to 133 by Ivy opponents. 

On Nov. 10, The Tigers dedicated their playing field to alumnus William C. Powers after he donated $10 million to the University and renamed played their playing field Powers Field at Princeton Stadium, on the university campus in Princeton, New Jersey.

Schedule

References

Princeton
Princeton Tigers football seasons
Princeton Tigers football